Crandola Valsassina (Valassinese ) is a comune (municipality) in the Province of Lecco in the Italian region Lombardy, located about  northeast of Milan and about  north of Lecco.

Crandola Valsassina borders the following municipalities: Casargo, Cortenova, Margno, Primaluna, Taceno.

References

External links
 Official website

Cities and towns in Lombardy
Valsassina